Labeobarbus trachypterus is a species of ray-finned fish in the genus Labeobarbus from the  upper Lualaba, Lake Mweru and lower Luapula in the Democratic Republic of the Congo and Zambia.

References

 

trachypterus
Taxa named by George Albert Boulenger
Fish described in 1915